The Lyrics: 1956 to the Present is a book released in November 2021 by the English musician Paul McCartney and the Irish poet Paul Muldoon. It is published by Penguin Books Ltd in the United Kingdom, W.W. Norton/Liveright in the United States of America and C.H. Beck in Germany.

Synopsis
The book consists of McCartney's discussions with Muldoon of the lyrics of 154 of his songs written during his time as a member of the rock bands the Beatles and Wings and as a solo artist. The songs are arranged alphabetically over two volumes. The book also includes many previously unseen photographs, paintings and handwritten texts. Muldoon spoke with McCartney over five years in two- to three-hour sessions during the creation of the book and felt that McCartney's "insights into his own artistic process confirm a notion at which we had but guessed—that Paul McCartney is a major literary figure who draws upon, and extends, the long tradition of poetry in English". Muldoon felt that their conversations mimicked McCartney's writing sessions with John Lennon as they were both "determined never to leave the room without something interesting".

McCartney had always previously declined to write an autobiography, recalling that he had been asked "More often than I can count" as "the time has never been right". McCartney has said that he has never kept a diary to recall the past but does have "my songs, hundreds of them, which I've learned serve much the same purpose. And these songs span my entire life".

Reception
The book received mostly positive reviews. David Hepworth of The Guardian wrote that "Whereas the other Beatles wrote fitfully after the group broke up, Paul kept getting out his pencil, taking his guitar into a quiet corner and writing yet another song, less on the basis of inspiration than the feeling that it was a muscle he must use or lose. It's this more than 10,000 hours spent setting himself the eternal puzzle of getting from the beginning of a song to its end that enabled him to dazzle Dustin Hoffman by writing "Picasso's Last Words (Drink to Me)" in front of him. 'Can you write a song about anything?' Hoffman asked. Yes, Dustin, he clearly can." He was also impressed by the people mentioned by McCartney: "The index is a reminder of the fact that, having been actively famous for 60 years, Paul McCartney has met everyone he’s had a mind to meet. Having learned from Craig Brown's recent book that Malcolm Muggeridge came to see the Beatles play in Hamburg, I no longer bat an eyelid at the revelation that in 1964 Paul rocked up unannounced at the door of Bertrand Russell."

David Hajdu of The New York Times noted that "McCartney shows how deeply he is steeped in literary history and how much his output as a songwriter has in common with the works of the likes of Dickens and Shakespeare." He concludes: "Aaaah … we realize: Paul really is a word man, the more literary and cerebral Beatle."

David Kirby of The Washington Post praised the book and said that "Reading The Lyrics is like standing in a master chef’s kitchen as he prepares a dish, adding a dash of this and a spoonful of that and talking to us so winningly that we don’t realize till later that he has withheld an ingredient, one that, because he was so deeply engaged himself, he didn’t know he was withholding."

Blake Morrison wrote in a review for the Guardian that the stories recalled by McCartney are unusual and entertaining:

Morrison concluded in his review that "Stripped of the music, the words on the page can look random or banal. But at best he's a wonderfully versatile lyricist: troubadour, comedian, elegist, social commentator, pasticheur. And anyone with even half an interest in the Beatles will find The Lyrics fascinating."

References

External links

2021 non-fiction books
Allen Lane (imprint) books
Books about the Beatles
Paul McCartney
Boni & Liveright books